Trichardt is a town on the N17 National Route in Gert Sibande District Municipality in the Mpumalanga province of South Africa. The village is 34 km west of Bethal and 32 km east-south-east of Leandra, adjacent to Secunda.

History
It originated as a settlement of the Dutch Reformed Church and was proclaimed in 1906. Named after Carolus Johannes Tregardt (1811-1901), son of the Voortrekker Louis Tregardt.

References

Populated places in the Govan Mbeki Local Municipality
Populated places established in 1906
1906 establishments in South Africa